In computing, scratch input is an acoustic-based method of Human-Computer Interaction (HCI) that takes advantage of the characteristic sound produced when a finger nail or other object is dragged over a surface, such as a table or wall. The technique is not limited to fingers; a stick or writing implements (e.g. chalk, or a pen) can also be used. The sound is often inaudible to the naked ear (i.e., silent). However, specialized microphones can digitize the sounds for interactive purposes. Scratch input was invented by Mann et al. in 2007, though the term was first used by Chris Harrison et al.

History 
A natural interface for musical expression operating on scratch input principles was first published and presented in June 2007. Later that year, it was extended to an implementation on a smartphone and also a wearable computer system.

In 2008, the Scratch Input project demonstrated a mobile device input system utilizing scratch input, simultaneously popularizing the term. This system captured audio transmitted through a surface on which a mobile phone was placed, enabling the entire surface to be used as an input device.

Uses 
Scratch input is an enabling input technique that is used in multitude of applications. The earliest application was a highly expressive musical instrument (Mann et al.) for use with mobile devices on natural objects, surfaces, or the like, as a non-synthesizing (i.e. idiophonic) musical instrument. Harrison et al. proposed it to create large, ad hoc gestural input areas when mobile devices are rested on tables.

Commercial potential 
Microsoft has expressed interest in Scratch Input.

See also 
 Scratch Input with ice skates
 Vision-assisted Scratch Input
 Scratch Input explanation and demonstration

References 

Human–computer interaction
User interfaces
Experimental musical instruments
Canadian inventions